Robert Bolt (29 January 1912 – 1991) was a Scottish footballer who played as a right half.

Career
Born in Lochgelly, Fife, he began his professional career with Heart of Midlothian, then played for Dunfermline Athletic and Falkirk, where he impressed sufficiently to be selected for a Scottish Football Association tour of North America, and to be signed for defending national champions, Rangers, both in May 1939. However, within months World War II broke out, rendering all his appearances for the Gers unofficial. In that period he was selected for Scotland in an international against a League of Ireland XI in 1940, but would never receive a full cap for his country.

Bolt had also made wartime appearances for Third Lanark, and he remained with the south Glasgow club for one season upon the resumption of official competitions before returning to Falkirk for another year, during which he played in the Scottish League Cup Final defeat to East Fife.

Latterly he relocated to Inverness where he turned out for Caledonian in the Highland League and played against Dundee United in the Scottish Cup in January 1952, the day after his 40th birthday. His son, also Bobby, also played for the club.

References

1912 births
1991 deaths
Scottish footballers
Footballers from Fife
People from Lochgelly
Association football wing halves
Scottish Junior Football Association players
Heart of Midlothian F.C. players
Dunfermline Athletic F.C. players
Falkirk F.C. players
Rangers F.C. players
Third Lanark A.C. players
Caledonian F.C. players
Scottish Football League players
Highland Football League players
Scotland wartime international footballers
Rosslyn Juniors F.C. players